Vijay Sundar Prashanth and Ramkumar Ramanathan were the defending champions but chose to defend their title with different partners. Prashanth partnered Brydan Klein but lost in the semifinals to Purav Raja and Ramanathan. Ramanathan partnered Raja and successfully defended his title.

Raja and Ramanathan won the title after defeating Arjun Kadhe and Saketh Myneni 7–6(7–3), 6–3 in the final.

Seeds

Draw

References

 Main draw

KPIT MSLTA Challenger - Doubles
2019 Doubles